An ice storm warning is a hazardous weather statement issued by the Weather Forecast Offices of the National Weather Service in
the United States which indicates that  freezing rain produces a significant and possibly damaging accumulation of ice on surfaces.

Prior to October 2017, a freezing rain advisory or freezing drizzle advisory was issued when a small amount of icing was possible.

In Canada, a freezing rain warning has the same meaning.

Example of an ice storm warning
632
WWUS44 KLZK 200235
WSWLZK

URGENT - WINTER WEATHER MESSAGE
National Weather Service Little Rock AR
835 PM CST Tue Feb 19 2019

ARZ003-012-013-200600-
/O.UPG.KLZK.WW.Y.0004.000000T0000Z-190220T0600Z/
/O.NEW.KLZK.IS.W.0001.190220T0235Z-190220T0600Z/
Boone-Newton-Searcy-
Including the cities of Harrison, Omaha, Lead Hill, Jasper,
Western Grove, Deer, Marshall, Leslie, and Gilbert
835 PM CST Tue Feb 19 2019

...ICE STORM WARNING IN EFFECT UNTIL MIDNIGHT CST TONIGHT...

* WHAT: Significant icing. Storm total ice accumulations of around
  two to three tenths of an inch are expected...mainly on trees
  and power lines.

* WHERE: Boone, Newton and Searcy Counties.

* WHEN: Until midnight CST tonight.

* ADDITIONAL DETAILS: The ice will result in tree limbs breaking
  and potential for power outages. There may also be some slick
  spots on bridges and overpasses.

PRECAUTIONARY/PREPAREDNESS ACTIONS...

An Ice Storm Warning means significant amounts of ice
accumulation are expected and may result in snapped power lines
and falling tree branches. Be sure to check road conditions
before traveling in these areas. Visit the Arkansas Department of
Transportation's website Idrivearkansas.com for the latest road
and traffic conditions.

&&

$$

See also
Severe weather terminology (United States)
Severe weather terminology (Canada)

References

External links
 National Weather Service
 Federal Emergency Management Agency
 Meteorological Service of Canada

Weather warnings and advisories